State Highway 64 (SH 64) is a Texas state highway that runs from Wills Point via Tyler to Henderson. (Rusk, Smith, and Van Zandt Counties)

History

SH 64 was originally designated on August 21, 1923 to replace SH 15A from Wills Point to Carthage. On November 19, 1923, it extended east to the Louisiana state line. On September 26, 1939, the portion east of Henderson was already part of U.S. Highway 79, which it was cosigned with since 1935. The remaining portion has not changed since.

Major junctions

Business route

SH 64 has one business route in Henderson, inventoried by TxDOT as Business SH 64-E. The route was designated on June 21, 1990, which, along with  Bus. US 79, replaced segments of Loop 153 and Loop 154. The two business routes are briefly concurrent through downtown Henderson.

Loop 153 was designated on May 18, 1944 from SH 64 and SH 323 southeast to downtown Henderson and then east to US 79. On December 19, 1955, the section from US 79 & FM 840 to US 79 was removed from the state highway system. On June 21, 1990, Loop 153 was cancelled, as it was transferred to Bus. SH 64-E and  Bus. US 79-F.

Loop 154 was designated on May 18, 1944 from SH 64 southward through Henderson to US 79. On June 21, 1990, Loop 154 was cancelled, as it was transferred to Bus. SH 64-E and Bus. US 79-F.

References

064
Transportation in Van Zandt County, Texas
Transportation in Smith County, Texas
Transportation in Rusk County, Texas
Tyler, Texas
1923 establishments in Texas